Pydna metaphsea is a moth of the family Geometridae.

References

Moths of Asia